The Square d'Orléans (also known as the cité des Trois-Frères), is a residential square in the 9th arrondissement of Paris, at 80, rue Taitbout.

The square was designed by the English architect Edward Cresy, and built in 1829 on land that had originally belonged to the family of the musician Daniel Auber. The original entry to the square was at 36, rue Saint-Lazare. The name 'Square d'Orléans' was probably a tribute to Louis Philippe of the Orléans family, who became King of France in 1830. ('Trois-Frères', the alternative name for the square, is the name of a former part of rue Taitbout).

The facades of the interior courtyard are decorated by porches with Ionic half-pillars, in a style that is analogous to that of the terraces of Regent's Park, London, (e.g. Cumberland Terrace), designed by John Nash in the 1820s.

The Square became a fashionable residence in which many celebrities of the July monarchy period took apartments, including Frédéric Chopin (Pavillon Nr. 9), George Sand (Pavillon Nr. 5), Marie Taglioni (Pavillon Nr. 2), Alexandre Dumas and Charles-Valentin Alkan (Pavillon Nr. 10).

References

Notes

Sources
 Centorame, Bruno "Le square d'Orléans", Mairie du Neuvième, Paris (in French), accessed 19 July 2013.
 François-Sappey, Brigitte and François Luguenot (2013). Charles-Valentin Alkan. In French. Paris: Bleu Nuit. .
 Goodwin, Gordon rev. Diana Cressy Burfield, "Cresy, Edward" in Oxford Dictionary of National Biography online, accessed 20 July 2013. 

Buildings and structures in the 9th arrondissement of Paris
Houses completed in 1830
Neoclassical architecture in France
1830 establishments in France
Squares in Paris
Buildings and structures by English architects